Club Atlético Defensor Lima is a Perúvian football club located in the district of Breña, Lima. The club was founded on July 31, 1931. 

The club plays in the Copa Perú, which is the third division of the Peruvian league.

History 
The club was 1973 Torneo Descentralizado champion.

The club have played at the highest level of Peruvian football on twenty three occasions, from 1961 Peruvian Primera División until 1978 Torneo Descentralizado, and 1989 Torneo Descentralizado until 1994 Torneo Descentralizado when was relegated.

The club played in the 1974 Copa Libertadores, but was eliminated by Millonarios and São Paulo FC in the semifinals.

Data 
 Foundation: July 31 1931
 Historical position among Peruvian teams in the Copa Libertadores de America: 11°
 Club Atlético Defensor Lima, Universitario, Alianza Lima and Sporting Cristal are the only Peruvian Clubs that have reached semi-finals. 
 Historical position in First Division: 16°.

Honours

National

League
Peruvian Primera División:
Winners (1): 1973

Peruvian Segunda División:
Winners (2): 1960, 1988
Runner-up (1): 1980

National cups
Torneo Plácido Galindo:
Winners (1): 1989

Regional
Liga Mayor de Fútbol de Lima:
Runner-up (1): 1980

Liga Provincial de Lima:
Winners (1): 1957
Runner-up (2): 1980, 1981

Liga Distrital del Cercado de Lima:
Winners (1): 2003 
Runner-up (3): 2000, 2002, 2008

Liga Distrital de Breña:
Runner-up (1): 2022

International
Copa Simón Bolivar:
Winners (1): 1974

Performance in CONMEBOL competitions
Copa Libertadores: 1 appearance
1974: Semi-Finals

Copa Simón Bolivar: 1 appearance
1975: Winners

References

See also
Peruvian football league system

 

Football clubs in Peru
Association football clubs established in 1931